James Cosgrove may refer to:

 James Cosgrove (comedian), English singer and comedian
 James Cosgrove (politician) (1861–1911), South Carolina politician